The United Kingdom, at the request of the United States, began expelling the native inhabitants of the Chagos Archipelago in 1968, concluding its forced deportations on 27 April 1973 with the evacuation of Peros Banhos atoll. The inhabitants, known at the time as the Ilois, are today known as Chagos Islanders or Chagossians.

Chagossians and human rights advocates have said that the Chagossian right of occupation was violated by the British Foreign Office as a result of the 1966 agreement between the British and American governments to provide an unpopulated island for a U.S. military base, and that additional compensation and a right of return be provided.

Legal action to claim compensation and the right of abode in the Chagos began in April 1973 when 280 islanders, represented by a Mauritian attorney, petitioned the government of Mauritius to distribute the £650,000 compensation provided in 1972 by the British government. It was not distributed until 1977. Various petitions and lawsuits have been ongoing since that time.

In 2019, the International Court of Justice issued an advisory opinion stating that the United Kingdom did not have sovereignty over the Chagos Islands and that the administration of the archipelago should be handed over "as rapidly as possible" to Mauritius. The United Nations General Assembly then voted to give Britain a six-month deadline to begin the process of handing-over the islands.

Chagossians

 The Chagos Archipelago was uninhabited when first visited by European explorers, and remained that way until the French established a small colony on the island of Diego Garcia, composed of 50–60 men and "a complement of slaves". The slaves came from what are now Mozambique and Madagascar via Mauritius. Thus, the original Chagossians were a mixture of the Bantu and Austronesian peoples. The French Government abolished slavery on 4 February 1794 (16 Pluviôse) but local administrations in Indian Ocean hindered its implementation.

The French surrendered Mauritius and its dependencies (including the Chagos) to the UK in the 1814 Treaty of Paris. However, nothing precluded the transport of slaves within the colony, and so the ancestors of the Chagossians were routinely shipped from Mauritius to Rodrigues to the Chagos to the Seychelles, and elsewhere. In addition, from 1820 to 1840, the atoll of Diego Garcia in the Chagos became the staging post for slave ships trading between Sumatra, the Seychelles, and the French island of Bourbon, adding a population of Malay slaves into the Chagos gene pool.

The British Government abolished slavery in 1834, and the colonial administration of the Seychelles (which administered the Chagos at the time) followed suit in 1835, with the former slaves "apprenticed" to their former masters until 1 February 1839, at which time they became freemen. Following emancipation, the former slaves became contract employees of the various plantation owners throughout the Chagos. Contracts were required by colonial law to be renewed before a magistrate at least every two years, but the distance from the nearest colonial headquarters (on Mauritius) meant few visits by officials, and that meant that these contract workers often stayed for decades between the visits of the Magistrate, and there is little doubt that some remained for a lifetime.

Those workers born in the Chagos were referred to as Creoles des Iles, or Ilois for short, a French Creole word meaning "Islanders" until the late 1990s, when they adopted the name Chagossians or Chagos Islanders.
With no other work to be had, and all the islands granted by the Governor of Mauritius to the plantation owners, life continued for the Chagossians as before, with European managers and Ilois workers and their families.

On the Chagos, this involved specific tasks, and rewards including housing (such as it was), rations and rum, and a relatively distinct Creole society developed. Over the decades, Mauritian, Seychellois, Chinese, Somali, and Indian workers were employed on the island at various times in the late 19th and early 20th centuries, contributing to the Chagossian culture, as did plantation managers and administrators, visiting ships' crews and passengers, British and Indian garrison troops stationed on the island in World War II, and residents of Mauritius – to which individual Chagossians and their families traveled and spent lengthy periods of time.

Significant demographic shifts in the island population began in 1962 when the French-financed Mauritian company Societé Huilière de Diego et Peros, which had consolidated ownership of all the plantations in the Chagos in 1883, sold the plantations to the Seychelles company Chagos-Agalega Company, which then owned the entire Chagos Archipelago, except for six acres at the mouth of the Diego Garcia lagoon. Thus, at no time did anyone living on the islands actually own a piece of real property there. Even the resident managers of the plantations were simply employees of absentee landlords.

In the 1930s, Father Dussercle reported that 60% of the plantation workers were "Children of the Isles"; that is, born in the Chagos. However, beginning in 1962, the Chagos-Agalega Company began hiring Seychellois contract workers almost exclusively, along with a few from Mauritius, as many of the Ilois left the Chagos because of the change in management; by 1964, 80% of the population were Seychellois under 18-month or 2-year contracts.

At this same time, the UK and U.S. began talks with the objective of establishing a military base in the Indian Ocean region. The base would need to be on British Territory as the U.S. had no possessions in the region. The U.S. was deeply concerned with the stability of the host nation of any potential base, and sought an unpopulated territory, to avoid the U.N.'s decolonisation requirements and the resulting political issues of sovereignty or anti-Western sentiment. The political posture of an independent Mauritius, from which the remote British islands of the central Indian Ocean were administered, was not clearly known, but was of a nature expected to work against the security of the base.

As a direct result of these geopolitical concerns, the British Colonial Office recommended to the UK Government in October 1964 to detach the Chagos from Mauritius.
 In January 1965, the U.S. Embassy in London formally requested the detachment of the Chagos as well. On 8 November, the UK created the British Indian Ocean Territory (BIOT) by an Order in Council. On 30 December 1966, the U.S. and UK signed a 50-year agreement to use the Chagos for military purposes, and that each island so used would be without a resident civilian population. This and other evidence at trial led the UK High Court of Justice Queen's Bench to decide in 2003 that the UK government ultimately decided to depopulate the entire Chagos to avoid scrutiny by the U.N.'s Special Committee on the Situation with Regard to the Implementation of the Declaration on the Granting of Independence to Colonial Countries and Peoples, known as the "Committee of 24".

In April 1967, the BIOT Administration bought out Chagos-Agalega for £600,000, thus becoming the sole property owner in the BIOT. The Crown immediately leased back the properties to Chagos-Agalega but the company terminated the lease at the end of 1967, after which the BIOT assigned management of the plantations to the former managers of Chagos-Agalega, who had incorporated in the Seychelles as Moulinie and Company, Limited.

Throughout the 20th century, there existed a total population of approximately one thousand individuals, with a peak population of 1,142 on all islands recorded in 1953. In 1966, the population was 924. This population was fully employed. Although it was common for local plantation managers to allow pensioners and the disabled to remain in the islands and continue to receive rations in exchange for light work, children after the age of 12 were required to work. In 1964, only 3 of a population of 963 were unemployed.

In the latter half of the 20th century, there were thus three major strands to the population – Mauritian and Seychelles contract workers (including management), and the Ilois. There is no agreement as to the numbers of Ilois living in the BIOT prior to 1971. However, the UK and Mauritius agreed in 1972 that there were 426 Ilois families numbering 1,151 individuals who left the Chagos for Mauritius voluntarily or involuntarily between 1965 and 1973. In 1977, the Mauritian government independently listed a total of 557 families totaling 2,323 people – 1,068 adults and 1,255 children – a number which included families that left voluntarily before the creation of the BIOT and never returned to the Chagos. The number reported by the Mauritian government in 1978 to have received compensation was 2,365, consisting of 1,081 adults and 1,284 minor children. The Mauritian Government's Ilois Trust Fund Board certified 1,579 individuals as Ilois in 1982.

The entire population of the Chagos, including the Ilois, was removed to Mauritius and the Seychelles by 27 April 1973.

Forced deportation

In early March 1967, the British Commissioner declared BIOT Ordinance Number Two. This unilateral proclamation, the Acquisition of Land for Public Purposes (Private Treaty) Ordinance, enabled the Commissioner to acquire any land he liked (for the UK government). On 3 April 1967, under the provisions of the order, the British government bought all the plantations of the Chagos archipelago for £660,000 from the Chagos Agalega Company. The plan was to deprive the Chagossians of an income and encourage them to leave the island voluntarily. In a memo from this period, Colonial Office head Denis Greenhill (later Lord Greenhill of Harrow) wrote to the British Delegation at the UN:

Another internal Colonial Office memo read:

Chagossian human rights activists charge that the number of Chagossian residents on Diego Garcia was deliberately under-counted in order to play down the scale of the proposed mass deportation. Three years before the depopulation plan was created, Sir Robert Scott, Governor of Mauritius, estimated the permanent population of Diego Garcia at 1,700. However, in a BIOT report made in June 1968, the British Government estimated that only 354 Chagossians were third-generation "belongers" on the islands. This number subsequently fell in further reports. Later in 1968, the British Government asked for help from the legal department of their own Foreign and Commonwealth Office (FCO) in creating a legal basis for deporting the Chagossians from the islands.

The first paragraph of the FCO's reply read:

The government is therefore often accused of deciding to clear all the islanders by denying they ever belonged on Diego Garcia in the first place and then removing them. This was to be done by issuing an ordinance that the island be cleared of all non-inhabitants. The legal obligation to announce the decision was fulfilled by publishing the notice in a small-circulation gazette not generally read outside of FCO staff.

Starting in March 1969, Chagossians visiting Mauritius found that they were no longer allowed to board the steamer home. They were told their contracts to work on Diego Garcia had expired. This left them homeless, jobless and without means of support. It also prevented word from reaching the rest of the Diego Garcia population. Relatives who travelled to Mauritius to seek their missing family members also found themselves unable to return.

Another action taken during the forced deportation was to massacre the residents' pets. As recorded by John Pilger:

Removal of the last inhabitants

In April 1971, John Rawling Todd told the Chagossians that they would be forced to leave.

A memorandum states:

By 15 October 1971, the Chagossians on Diego Garcia had all been removed to the Peros Banhos and Salomon plantations on ships chartered from Mauritius and the Seychelles. In November 1972 the plantation on Salomon atoll was evacuated, with the population allowed to choose to be taken either to the Seychelles or Mauritius. On 26 May 1973 the plantation on Peros Banhos atoll was closed and the last of the islanders sent to Seychelles or Mauritius, according to their choice.

Those sent to the Seychelles received a severance pay equal to their remaining contract term.  Those sent to Mauritius were to receive a cash settlement from the British Government distributed through the Mauritian Government. However, the Mauritian Government did not distribute this settlement until four years later, and the Chagossians on Mauritius were not compensated until 1977.

International law
While no appropriate venue was found to hear the case for many decades, the International Court of Justice offered an Advisory Opinion at the request of the UN General Assembly on 25 February 2019.

Prior to the International Court of Justice's Advisory Opinion, the European Court of Human Rights rejected an Application for Trial in 2012 stating that no right of petition exists for residents of the British Indian Ocean Territory before that court.

According to Article 7(d) of the Rome Statute of the International Criminal Court which established the International Criminal Court (ICC), "deportation or forcible transfer of population" constitutes a crime against humanity if it is "committed as part of a widespread or systematic attack directed against any civilian population, with knowledge of the attack". However, the ICC is not retrospective; alleged crimes committed before 1 July 2002 cannot be judged by the ICC.

On 1 April 2010, the Chagos Marine Protected Area (MPA) was declared to cover the waters around the Chagos Archipelago. However, Mauritius objected, stating this was contrary to its legal rights, and on 18 March 2015, the Permanent Court of Arbitration ruled that the Chagos Marine Protected Area was illegal under the United Nations Convention on the Law of the Sea as Mauritius had legally binding rights to fish in the waters surrounding the Chagos Archipelago, to an eventual return of the Chagos Archipelago, and to the preservation of any minerals or oil discovered in or near the Chagos Archipelago prior to its return.

On 23 June 2017, the United Nations General Assembly (UNGA) voted in favour of referring the territorial dispute between Mauritius and the UK to the International Court of Justice (ICJ) in order to clarify the legal status of the Chagos Islands archipelago in the Indian Ocean. The motion was approved by a majority vote with 94 voting for and 15 against and was voted on by the UNGA in 2019.

On 25 February 2019, the International Court of Justice delivered an advisory opinion on the questions:
"(a) Was the process of decolonization of Mauritius lawfully completed when Mauritius was granted independence in 1968, following the separation of the Chagos Archipelago from Mauritius and having regard to international law, including obligations reflected in General Assembly resolutions 1514 (XV) of 14 December 1960, 2066 (XX) of 16 December 1965, 2232 (XXI) of 20 December 1966 and 2357 (XXII) of 19 December 1967?;
(b) What are the consequences under international law, including obligations reflected in the above-mentioned resolutions, arising from the continued administration by the United Kingdom of Great Britain and Northern Ireland of the Chagos Archipelago, including with respect to the inability of Mauritius to implement a programme for the resettlement on the Chagos Archipelago of its nationals, in particular those of Chagossian origin?"

The Court delivered its opinion that "the process of decolonization of Mauritius was not lawfully completed when that country acceded to independence" and that "the United Kingdom is under an obligation to bring to an end its administration of the Chagos Archipelago as rapidly as possible."

Compensation
In 1972, the British Government allocated £650,000 for compensation to the 426 Ilois families displaced to Mauritius. This money was intended to be paid directly to the families, and was given to the Mauritian government for distribution. The Mauritian government, however, withheld the money until 1978. In response to litigation by islanders, the British Government contributed an additional £4 million, which was again turned over to the Mauritian Government, which distributed it in a series of disbursements between 1982 and 1987.

Protests
The Mauritian opposition party Mouvement Militant Mauricien (MMM) began to question the validity under international law of the purchase of the Chagos and the removal of the Chagossians.

In 1975, David Ottaway of The Washington Post wrote and published an article titled "Islanders Were Evicted for U.S. Base" which related the plight of the Chagossians in detail. This prompted two U.S. Congressional committees to look into the matter. They were told that the "entire subject of Diego Garcia is considered classified".

In September 1975, The Sunday Times published an article titled "The Islanders that Britain Sold". That year, a Methodist preacher from Kent, George Champion, who changed his name to George Chagos, began a one-man picket of the FCO, with a placard reading simply: 'DIEGO GARCIA'. This continued until his death in 1982.

In 1976, the government of the Seychelles took the British government to court. The Aldabra, Desroches, and Farquhar Islands were separated from the BIOT and returned to the Seychelles as it achieved independence in 1976.

In 1978, at Bain Des Dames in Port Louis, six Chagossian women went on a hunger strike, and there were demonstrations in the streets (mainly organised by the MMM) over Diego Garcia.

In 1979, a Mauritian Committee asked Mr. Vencatassen's lawyer to negotiate more compensation. In response to this, the British Government offered £4m to the surviving Chagossians on the express condition that Vencatassen withdraw his case and that all Chagossians sign a "full and final" document renouncing any right of return to the island.

All but 12 of the 1,579 Chagossians eligible to receive compensation at the time signed the documents. The document also contained provisions for those that could not write, by allowing the impression of an inked thumbprint to ratify the document. However, some illiterate islanders say that they were tricked into signing the documents and that they would never have signed sincerely had they known the outcome of their signatures.

In 2007, Mauritian President Anerood Jugnauth threatened to leave the Commonwealth of Nations in protest at the treatment of the islanders and to take the UK to the International Court of Justice.

Developments since 2000

Legal developments

In 2000 the British High Court granted the islanders the right to return to the Archipelago. However, they were not actually allowed to return, and in 2002 the islanders and their descendants, now numbering 4,500, returned to court claiming compensation, after what they said were two years of delays by the British Foreign Office.

In December 2001, three Chagossians Olivier Bancoult, Marie Therese Mein, and Marie Isabelle France-Charlot sued the US government for being expelled from the islands and transferred against their will to another location. The lawsuit accused the United States of "trespass, intentional infliction of emotional distress, forced relocation, racial discrimination, torture, and genocide."

On 10 June 2004 the British government made two Orders in Council under the Royal Prerogative forever banning the islanders from returning home, to override the effect of the 2000 court decision. As of May 2010, some of the Chagossians were still making return plans to turn Diego Garcia into a sugarcane and fishing enterprise as soon as the defence agreement expired (which some thought would happen as early as 2016). A few dozen other Chagossians were still fighting to be housed in the UK.

On 11 May 2006 the British High Court ruled that the 2004 Orders-in-Council were unlawful, and consequently that the Chagossians were entitled to return to the Chagos Archipelago. In Bancoult v. McNamara, an action in the United States District Court for the District of Columbia against Robert McNamara, the former United States Secretary of Defense, was dismissed as a nonjusticiable political question.

On 23 May 2007, the UK Government's appeal against the 2006 High Court ruling was dismissed, and they took the matter to the House of Lords. On 22 October 2008, the UK Government won on appeal, the House of Lords overturned the 2006 High Court ruling and upheld the two 2004 Orders-in-Council and with them the Government's ban on anyone returning. On 29 June 2016, this decision was upheld by the Supreme Court of the United Kingdom, again by a 3–2 majority.

In 2005, 1,786 Chagossians made Application for a Trial of the issues with the European Court of Human Rights. The Application said that the British Government violated their rights under the European Convention on Human Rights, specifically: Article 3 – The prohibition against degrading treatment; Article 6 – The right to a fair trial; Article 8 – The right to privacy in one's home; Article 13 – The right to obtain remedy before national courts, and; Protocol 1, Article 1 – The right to peaceful enjoyment of one's possessions.  On 11 December 2012, the court rejected on the Application's request for a trial ruling that the B.I.O.T. did not come under the jurisdiction of the ECtHR, and that in any event, all claims had previously been raised and settled in the proper national, that is British, courts.

Diplomatic cables leaks
According to leaked diplomatic cables obtained by WikiLeaks and released in 2010, in a calculated move in 2009 to prevent re-settlement of the BIOT by native Chagossians, the UK proposed that the BIOT become a "marine reserve" with the aim of preventing the former inhabitants from returning to their lands. The summary of the diplomatic cable is as follows:

Internet petition 
On 5 March 2012, an international petition was launched on We the People section of the whitehouse.gov website in order to ask the White House in the United States to consider the Chagos case.

The petition read as follows:

On 4 April 2012, the sufficient number of 25,000 signatures was met to require a response from the Office of the President under its policy at that time.

An undated response was posted on the White House petition web site by the United States Department of State, in the name of Michael Posner (Assistant Secretary of State for Democracy, Human Rights, and Labor), Philip Gordon (Assistant Secretary of State for European and Eurasian Affairs) and Andrew J. Shapiro (Assistant Secretary of State for Political-Military Affairs). The non-committal response read as follows:

2016 ruling
In November 2016, the United Kingdom restated it would not permit Chagossians to return to the Chagos Archipelago.

2017 UNGA vote
On 23 June 2017, the United Nations General Assembly (UNGA) voted in favour of referring the territorial dispute between Mauritius and the UK to the International Court of Justice (ICJ) in order to clarify the legal status of the Chagos Islands archipelago in the Indian Ocean. The motion was approved by a majority vote with 94 voting for and 15 against.

2018 ICJ hearing
In September 2018, the International Court of Justice in The Hague, heard arguments in a case regarding whether Britain violated Mauritian sovereignty when it took possession of the islands for its own purposes.

On 25 February 2019 the ICJ ruled that the United Kingdom infringed on the right of self-determination of the Chagos Islanders and was obliged to cede its control of the islands.

On 22 May 2019, the United Nations General Assembly adopted a resolution welcoming the 25 February 2019 ICJ advisory opinion on the legal consequences of separating the Chagos Archipelago from Mauritius in 1965, demanding that the United Kingdom unconditionally withdraw its colonial administration from the area within six months.  The resolution was passed by a recorded vote of 116 in favour, to 6 against (Australia, Hungary, Israel, Maldives, United Kingdom, United States), with 56 abstentions.

As of January 2020, the UK has refused to abide by the ICJ's ruling.

See also
 Stealing a Nation
 Chagos Archipelago sovereignty dispute
 Right of return
 Right to homeland
 Diaspora politics

References

Bibliography
 
 
 
 The Chagos Islands and international orders: human rights, rule of law, and foreign rule, by Martin Welz, International Relations, Nov 5, 2022

External links
 Archive of "Let Them Return", The Chagos People's Homeland Campaign
 Stealing a Nation, a 2004 documentary by John Pilger
 Chagos Archipelagos timeline (October 2005 archive)
 http://www.letusreturnusa.org/
 http://chagosrefugeesgroup.org/

Chagos Archipelago
Ethnic cleansing
Chagossians
Chagos Archipelago sovereignty dispute
British Indian Ocean Territory people
1960s in Asia
1960s in the United Kingdom
1970s in Asia
1970s in the United Kingdom
1960s in the British Empire
1970s in the British Empire
Forcibly depopulated communities
Crimes against humanity
People exiled to Mauritius
National questions
Mauritius–United Kingdom relations